Gemorodes is a genus of moths of the family Xyloryctidae.

Species
 Gemorodes delphinopa Meyrick, 1930
 Gemorodes diclera Meyrick, 1925

References

Xyloryctidae
Xyloryctidae genera